Kühnen is a surname. Notable people with the surname include:

 Michael Kühnen (1955–1991), German neo-Nazi activist
 Patrik Kühnen (born 1966), German tennis player
 Uta Kühnen (born 1975), German judoka